Blenniella is a genus of combtooth blennies found in the Pacific and Indian Oceans.

Species
There are currently nine recognized species in this genus:
 Blenniella bilitonensis (Bleeker, 1858) (Lined rockskipper)
 Blenniella caudolineata (Günther, 1877) (Blue-spotted blenny)
 Blenniella chrysospilos (Bleeker, 1857) (Red-spotted blenny)
 Blenniella cyanostigma (Bleeker, 1849) (Striped rockskipper)
 Blenniella gibbifrons (Quoy & Gaimard, 1824) (Hump-headed blenny)
 Blenniella interrupta (Bleeker, 1857) (Dashed-line blenny)
 Blenniella leopardus (Fowler, 1904)
 Blenniella paula (Bryan & Herre, 1903)
 Blenniella periophthalmus (Valenciennes, 1836) (Blue-dashed rockskipper)

References

 
Salarinae
Taxa named by Earl Desmond Reid